Zarréu is one of three parishes (administrative divisions) in the Degaña municipality, within the province and autonomous community of Asturias, in northern Spain.

The population is 867 (INE 2007).

Villages
 Pruída
 Zarréu

References

Parishes in Degaña